Lieutenant General Ashwani Kumar, PVSM, AVSM, VSM, ADC (born 17 Oct 1959) is a former general officer in the Indian Army. He retired after 39 years of service and last served as the Adjutant General.

Early life and education

Kumar was born in Allahabad. He did his schooling and graduation from Dehradun. He is a graduate of the Defence Services Staff College (DSSC), Wellington and has attended the Higher Command Course at the Army War College, Mhow at Indore, India. He is also a graduate from prestigious National Defence College and has completed his Ph.D in Spirituality Management in Armed Forces. He has successfully completed Independent Directors Course from MDI Gurgaon, India. He also attended an Air Defence Missile Course in erstwhile USSR.

Military career

Kumar is an alumnus of the Indian Military Academy, Dehradun and was commissioned into the Air Defence Artillery in June 1980. He later commanded a Light Air Defence Regiment, which was actively involved in Operation Parakram. He has the distinction of commanding an infantry Brigade in Western theatre and was the Deputy General Officer Commanding of an active infantry division deployed on Line of Control in Northern Command. He commanded a division and a Corps on the Western front prior to assuming the appointment of Adjutant General in July 2017. Notably, he is the first Army Air Defence Officer to have commanded a Corps and to have become a PSO at Army Headquarters. The officer has successfully tenanted various prestigious staff appointments including Brigade Major of Mountain Brigade in intense insurgency area, MGGS at a Command HQ, ADG DV at AHQ and DG DC & W at AHQ. He has done instructional appointments at Indian Military Academy, Dehradun. School of Arty, Deolali and Defence Service Staff College, Wellington. He was also posted as Military Observer in UNO MIL Liberia. For his distinguished services, he has been awarded VSM in 2015, AVSM in 2017 and PVSM in 2019 and was appointed as  Honorary ADC to the President on 1 January 2018.

Honours and decorations

Dates of rank

References

Recipients of the Param Vishisht Seva Medal
Recipients of the Vishisht Seva Medal
National Defence Academy (India) alumni
Living people
People from New Delhi
Indian generals
Recipients of the Ati Vishisht Seva Medal
Indian Military Academy alumni
University of Madras alumni
1959 births
Army War College, Mhow alumni
Defence Services Staff College alumni